This is a list of episodes from the sixth season of Barnaby Jones.

Broadcast history
The season originally aired Thursdays at 10:00-11:00 pm (EST).

Episodes

Barnaby Jones (season 6)